China Railway Construction Corporation Limited (abbreviated CRCC) is a listed construction enterprise based in Beijing, China, that was the second largest construction and engineering company in the world by revenue in 2014.

The limited company was incorporated in 2007 in order to float the assets of China Railway Construction Corporation [Group] (CRCCG, or the holding company) in Shanghai and Hong Kong stock exchange. CRCCG retained some assets which was deemed not suitable to float in the stock exchange.

Corporate structure
CRCCG is under the supervision of the State-owned Assets Supervision and Administration Commission of the State Council. Since February 2008, A shares and H shares of CRCC are listing on the Shanghai and Hong Kong stock exchanges.

The financial report of the parent company (holding company) is not disclosed. As both parent and subsidiary share almost the same English name, one without the word "Limited" (they have different names in Chinese), the business activities of the holding company was often incorrectly mixed up with the publicly floated limited liability subsidiary by the media.

Subsidiaries of CRCC
China Railway Bureau Groups numbered 11 through 25 (the Bureau Groups numbering 1 through 10 belong to competitor China Railway Engineering Corporation)
China Railway Construction Bridge Engineering Bureau Group Co., Ltd. (former 13th Bureau)
China Civil Engineering Construction Corporation (CCECC)
 CRCC High-tech Equipment (CRCCE)
China Railway Construction Group Ltd.
China Railway Electrification Bureau Group Co., Ltd.
China Railway Real Estate Group Co., Ltd.
China Railway Goods and Materials Co., Ltd.
Kunming China Railway Large Maintenance Machinery Co., Ltd.
China Railway Construction Investment Co., Ltd.
CRCC Finance Company Limited
China Railway Urban Construction Group Co., Ltd.

History

Founding
Formerly the railway arm of the People's Liberation Army (found 1948 and became part of the Ministry of Railways from 1982). Along with China Railway Engineering Corporation, both railway construction super conglomerates were under the Ministry until 2000. The company maintains links to the People's Liberation Army.

In 2003, China Civil Engineering Construction Corporation, another former entity of the Ministry of Railways, was assigned to China Railway Construction Corporation as its subsidiary.

IPO
In preparation for listing, China Railway Construction Corporation Limited was incorporated in 2007 as a joint-stock company with limited liabilities which received most of the assets of the parent company. 5 Build-operate-transfer projects were not included, namely Chongqing Tiefa Suiyu Highway, Nanjing Yangtze River Tunnel, Beijing Tongda Jingcheng Highway, Xianyang Zhongtie Road and Bridge and Guangdong Chaojie Highway. Later on in 2015 CRCC bought Chongqing Tiefa Suiyu Highway from the parent company, while 20% was retained by Chongqing Expressway Co., Ltd.

The company premiered on the Shanghai and Hong Kong in February 2008, raising US$5.7 billion, making the second largest IPO of that year. The performance was poorer than expected because of poor investment atmosphere from United States subprime mortgage crisis and China's economic macro-control.

U.S. sanctions 
In November 2020, Donald Trump issued an executive order prohibiting any American company or individual from owning shares in companies that the United States Department of Defense has listed as having links to the People's Liberation Army, which included China Railway Construction Corporation.

Projects

Domestic
CRCC has built much of the transportation infrastructure in China including high speed rail, subways, and expressways.
 Beijing–Shanghai High-Speed Railway, construction began in April 2008 and commercial serviced started in June 2011.

Asia
Bangladesh - The Dhaka Elevated Expressway, the first elevated expressway of Bangladesh, is to be constructed by CRCC in a $1.062 billion contract signed with the Italthai Industrial Group.
 Cambodia - The CRCC conducted feasibility studies on railway double tracking and railway electrification in Cambodia, SisophonKampong Cham high speed railway, Phnom PenhStung Treng railway, and urban rail (metro and light rail) system in Phnom Penh.
 Pakistan - The construction of Construction on the first new-build portion of the Karachi - Lahore Motorway project between Lahore and Multan costing approximately $1.5 billion was launched in November 2015 as a joint venture between the China Railway Construction Corporation Limited and Pakistan's Zahir Khan and Brothers, Engineers and Constructors.

Middle East and North Africa
Algeria - A consortium of CRCC and CITIC constructed the Central and Western sections of the Algeria East–West Highway in a contract worth $6.25 billion.
Egypt -  Track upgrade contract for $600m won by the China Civil Engineering Construction Corporation unit in April 2015.
Saudi Arabia - CRCC wins 6.7 billion Saudi riyal contract in 2009 to build the first  of the metro in Mecca. However, due to net loss of the project, the state-owned parent company subsidized the listed company to cover the loss.
Turkey - A consortium of CRCC and China National Machinery Import and Export Corporation with two Turkish construction firms constructed the Ankara-Istanbul high-speed railway, which opened in 2014.
UAE - Etihad Rail is a national rail system built by the CRCC. More plans are there to build more rail lines.
Qatar - CRCC formed a JV with local company HBK and the JV constructed the Lusail Stadium where the final of FIFA World Cup 2022 was hosted along with other games and the final ceremony. The stadium has a capacity of 80000 and is one of the largest in the Middle East and the largest in Qatar.

Europe
Russia
In 2014, the Mayor of Moscow, Sergey Sobyanin, signed an agreement with the China Railway Construction Corporation and China International Fund to build a Troitskaya line of the Moscow Metro and finance construction by developing real estate at the stations. By 2016, the city was again negotiating with CRCC for construction of the line. Rather than CRCC handing the whole project, the city wanted to split the work between Russian and Chinese workers. The parties agreed not only on construction of the Kommunarskaya line, but also three stations of the Bolshaya Koltsevaya line, Michurinsky Prospekt, Aminyevskoye Shosse, and Prospekt Vernadskogo. 

Africa
Angola - CRCC built a  railway line in Angola that opened in 2015 for a contract value of $1.83 bn.
Mali - CRCC signed a $1.5 bn deal with the government of Mali to improve its railway system.
Nigeria - The China Civil Engineering Construction Corporation unit signed a $3.5bn contract with the Ogun State in April 2015 to construct a railway line through the state.

Other business areas
The main business activity of the company is in construction and engineering but it is also engaged in real estate development and copper mining.

References

External links
 

Government-owned companies of China
Construction and civil engineering companies of China
Real estate companies of China
Companies in the CSI 100 Index
Companies listed on the Hong Kong Stock Exchange
Companies listed on the Shanghai Stock Exchange
Chinese companies established in 2007
Railway construction companies of China
Defence companies of the People's Republic of China
Chinese companies established in 1948
Construction and civil engineering companies established in 1948
Construction and civil engineering companies established in 2007